The AAA battery (or triple-A battery) is a standard size of dry cell battery. One or more AAA batteries are commonly used in low-drain portable electronic devices. A zinc–carbon battery in this size is designated by IEC as R03, by ANSI C18.1 as 24, by old JIS standard as UM-4, and by other manufacturer and national standard designations that vary depending on the cell chemistry. The size was first introduced by The American Ever Ready Company in 1911.

Rechargeable nickel–metal hydride (NiMH) AAA batteries typically weigh .

Use
AAA batteries are most often used in small electronic devices, such as TV remote controls, MP3 players and digital cameras. Devices that require the same voltage, but have a higher current draw, are often designed to use larger batteries such as the AA battery type.  AA batteries have about three times the capacity of AAA batteries. With the increasing efficiency and miniaturization of modern electronics, many devices that previously were designed for AA batteries (remote controls, cordless computer mice and keyboards, etc.) are being replaced by models that accept AAA battery cells.

As of 2007, AAA batteries accounted for 24% of alkaline primary battery sales in the United States. In Japan as of 2011, 28% of alkaline primary batteries sold were AAA. In Switzerland as of 2008, AAA batteries totaled 30% of primary battery sales and 32% of  secondary battery (rechargeable) sales.

Other common names

 U16 (In Britain until the 1980s)
 Micro (Germany)
 Ministilo (Italy)
 MN2400
 MX2400
 Type 286 (SovietUnion/Russia)
 Palito (Brazil)
 Pencil cell (India)
 UM 4 (JIS)
 #7 (China)
 6135-99-117-3143 (NSN)

See also
 List of battery sizes
 Battery nomenclature
 Battery recycling
 Battery holder

References

External links
 Specifications for Energizer alkaline AAA battery (E92)
 Brand Neutral Drawing Of Alkaline AAA Battery based on ANSI specifications
 Brand Neutral Drawing Of NICAD AAA Battery based on ANSI Specifications 
 Brand Neutral Drawing Of NiMH AAA Battery based on ANSI Specifications
 Brand Neutral Drawing Of Rechargeable AAA Battery based on ANSI Specifications

Battery shapes